The Port Authority Bus Terminal (colloquially known as the Port Authority and by its acronym PABT) is a bus terminal located in Manhattan in New York City. It is the busiest bus terminal in the world by volume of traffic, serving about 8,000 buses and 225,000 people on an average weekday and more than 65 million people a year. 

The terminal is located in Midtown Manhattan at 625 Eighth Avenue between 40th Street and 42nd Street, one block east of the Lincoln Tunnel and one block west of Times Square. It is one of three bus terminals operated by the Port Authority of New York and New Jersey (PANYNJ); the other two are George Washington Bridge Bus Station in Upper Manhattan and Journal Square Transportation Center in Jersey City.

PABT serves as a terminus and departure point for commuter routes as well as for long-distance intercity bus service and is a major transit hub for residents of New Jersey. It has 223 departure gates and 1,250 car parking spaces, as well as commercial and retail space. In 2011, there were more than 2.263 million bus departures from the terminal.

PABT opened in 1950. It was built to consolidate several private terminals spread across Midtown Manhattan. A second wing, extending to 42nd Street, was added in 1979. Since then, the terminal has reached peak hour capacity, leading to congestion and overflow on local streets. It does not allow for layover parking; which requires that buses use local streets or lots, or return through the tunnel empty. PANYNJ has been unsuccessful in its attempts to expand passenger facilities through public private partnership, and in 2011 it delayed construction of a bus depot annex, citing budgetary constraints. In June 2013, it commissioned an 18-month study that considered options for the terminal's reconfiguration, expansion, or replacement.

History

Site

Before PABT was constructed, there were several terminals scattered throughout Midtown Manhattan, some of which were part of hotels. The Federal Writers Project's 1940 publication of New York: A Guide to the Empire State lists the All American Bus Depot on West 42nd, the Consolidated Bus Terminal on West 41st, and the Hotel Astor Bus Terminal on West 45th. The Dixie Bus Center on 42nd Street, located on the ground floor of the hotel of the same name, opened in 1930 and operated until 1959. The Baltimore & Ohio Railroad had coach service aboard a ferry to Communipaw Terminal in Jersey City that ran from an elegant bus terminal with a revolving bus platform in the Chanin Building at 42nd and Lexington. Greyhound Lines had its own facility adjacent to Pennsylvania Station and did not move into PABT until 1963, at which time all long-distance bus service to the city was consolidated at the terminal.

The Lincoln Tunnel between Manhattan and New Jersey had opened in 1937. Within a year and a half of the tunnel's opening, five companies were operating 600 interstate bus trips through the tunnel every day. The city opposed letting buses go through Midtown Manhattan because they caused congestion. A large bus terminal near the mouth of the Lincoln Tunnel was first mandated in December 1939, after the city announced that it would ban commuter buses from driving into congested parts of Midtown. The ban was supposed to go into effect in January 1941. In July 1940, at the request of New York City mayor Fiorello H. La Guardia, the Port Authority started conducting a survey into the causes and effects of intercity and commuter bus traffic in Manhattan. That December, Times Square Terminal Inc. filed an application to build and operate a commuter bus terminal from 41st to 42nd Streets between Eighth and Ninth Avenues, adjacent to the McGraw-Hill Building on land owned by the McGraw-Hill Publishing Company. According to projections at the time, the $4 million terminal could be completed within nine months. Manhattan Borough President Stanley M. Isaacs proposed building a short $600,000 tube between the Lincoln Tunnel and the new terminal. The city approved the construction of the new terminal and connecting tunnel in January 1941. Meanwhile, New York Supreme Court Justice John E. McGeehan blocked La Guardia's proposed bus ban on the grounds that it was unreasonable.

Plans for a bus terminal were delayed because of World War II, which used the resources intended for most projects that were not directly involved in the war effort. In June 1944, the New York state government allocated $180,000 to the Port Authority for studying the feasibility of constructing a bus terminal in Midtown Manhattan. Early the next year, plans for a mid-Manhattan bus terminal were presented to the different bus companies. While most major bus lines agreed to the plan, Greyhound did not, for it was already planning on expanding its then terminal near Penn Station.

The New York City Board of Estimate approved the construction of the new terminal in January 1947. It was to be built one block south of the aborted Times Square Terminal Inc. site, on the block bounded by 40th and 41st Streets and Eighth and Ninth Avenues. Plans for the structural design were revised substantially in March 1948, when the Port Authority added a 500-spot parking lot for cars atop the terminal's roof, to be accessed via a series of ramps. The last industrial tenant on the future terminal's site moved away the following month, and the Port Authority hosted a groundbreaking ceremony for the terminal in January 1949.

Original construction and additions

The original Mid-Manhattan Bus Terminal (now PABT's South Wing), built in the International Style, was opened on December 15, 1950, as a generic "Port Authority bus terminal". A vertical addition of three parking levels, able to accommodate 1,000 cars, was completed in 1963. In 2007, the South Wing underwent a seismic retrofit in a $52 million building code-compliance project to reinforce and stabilize it against earthquakes.

Plans to expand the bus station to 42nd Street were floated as early as 1965. The North Wing was opened in 1979. This expansion increased capacity by 50 percent, and created a new facade comprising 27 steel X-shaped trusses. Assessing this facade design, Virtualtourist listed PABT in 2008 as one of the "World's Top 10 Ugliest Buildings and Monuments".

In the late 1970s and early 1980s, the area in and around PABT was considered dangerous by police, tourists, and commuters due to high crime, prostitution, vagrant behavior, and inadequate upkeep and law enforcement in the building and nearby Times Square, especially after dark, but this is no longer the case. During 1997, the terminal was the subject of a study, coordinated by Professor Marcus Felson of Rutgers University, which identified strategic changes to the building's design and area supervision with a view to reducing crime and other problems.

Expansion proposals

Air rights
The PANYNJ has attempted to further expand the terminal through public–private partnerships by leasing air rights over the North Wing.

In 1999, a 35-story building, to be known as 7 Times Square, was proposed to be constructed over the North Wing and a golf driving range was to be constructed over the South Wing. However, the project was put on hold in 2001 due to a decline in the economy following the dot com bust.

Between 2000 and 2011, the PANYNJ worked with Vornado Realty Trust, which had partnered with the Lawrence Ruben Company. In November 2007, the PANYNJ announced the terms of an agreement in which it would receive nearly $500 million in a lease arrangement for a new office tower that would also provide funds for additional terminal facilities. New escalators would be installed to help move passengers more quickly between the gate area and the ground floor. Construction was expected to begin in 2009 or 2010, and take four years to complete. The agreement expired in August 2009, and in May 2010, Vornado was given a retroactive extension on the deadline to August 2011. In July 2011, Vornado announced they had found a new partner to partially finance the tower, but in November 2011, the new backers pulled out of the project.

In June 2014, the PANYNJ received a higher price than anticipated for the sale of nearby property, $115 million versus $100 million. The value of air rights above the terminal would be higher than previously appraised, thanks to rising property values in the area surrounding the terminal and an indication of the rising value air rights above the terminal. The agency had intentions to release a request for proposals for air-rights development in 2014–2015.

West Side bus depot

The Port Authority allows for limited layovers of buses, thus requiring companies to make other arrangements during off-peak hours and between trips. Many park on local streets or parking lots during the day, while others make a round-trip without passengers through the Lincoln Tunnel to use layover facilities in New Jersey. Bus layover parking on city streets is regulated by the NYDOT, which assigns locations throughout the city. In the vicinity of PABT, these are concentrated on the side streets between Ninth and Twelfth Avenues from 30th Street to 60th Street.

Various studies and news reports have concluded that there is a need for a new bus depot in Midtown. In a joint study by New York City and PANYNJ, it was determined that a preferred location for a bus depot was at Galvin Plaza located on 39th to 40th Streets between Tenth and Eleventh Avenues. However, this proposed location for commuter buses would not have capacity for charter buses and tour buses.

The PANYNJ announced considerable toll increases on its crossings between New York and New Jersey in August 2011, citing as one of their reasons the construction of an $800 million "new bus garage connected to the Port Authority Bus Terminal, which will serve as a traffic reliever to the Lincoln Tunnel and midtown Manhattan streets, saving two-thirds of the empty bus trips that must make two extra trips through the tunnel each day." Originally included in the PANYNJ 2007–2016 Capital Plan, construction of the garage was scrapped by the agency in October 2011, after it cited budgetary constraints due to an arrangement whereby the toll increases would be incrementally implemented.

In April 2012, the director of the PANYNJ reported that a proposal had been made by developer Larry Silverstein, who has a memorandum of understanding to develop a property at 39th Street and Dyer Avenue near the ramps between the tunnel and the terminal, to construct a bus garage with a residential tower above it. This parcel is not large enough to accommodate bus ramps and would require the use of elevators, which seemed to be a new type of application for bus storage. The proposal has not progressed any further.

In 2014, the PANYNJ made an application for a $230 million grant to the Federal Transit Administration for development of the garage.

Replacement proposals
In June 2013, the PANYNJ commissioned an 18-month study that was to consider reconfiguration, expansion, and replacement options for PABT and new bus staging and storage facilities on Manhattan's West Side. The $5.5 million contract awarded to Kohn Pedersen Fox and Parsons Brinkerhoff would look into potential public-private financing, including the sale of air rights and cost-sharing with private bus carriers.

In 2016, the PANYNJ invited a number of development teams to propose ideas for replacement of the existing bus terminal. Subsequently, in May 2019, the PANYNJ commenced the environmental review process for PABT's replacement. The PANYNJ planned to host four public hearings, two each in New York and New Jersey, in July and September 2019. Three plans were considered: building a new terminal on the site, building a new terminal elsewhere, or moving intercity buses elsewhere while renovations took place in the existing terminal. In anticipation of opportunities that reconstruction of the bus terminal will portend, the Hell's Kitchen South Coalition produced its own plan for the area.

In January 2021, the Port Authority released plans for reconstructing the terminal on the same site, with expansion of bus layover facilities. The PANYNJ hired British architects Foster + Partners and Chicago-based design and engineering firm Epstein Global in August 2022 to design the new terminal.

Art and advertising

The Commuters, a sculpture of three weary bus passengers and a clock salvaged from the original terminal by George Segal, was unveiled in the main ticket area in 1982. 42nd Street Ballroom, a rolling ball sculpture by George Rhoads on the main floor of the North Wing, was installed in 1983. A statue of Jackie Gleason in the guise of one of his most famous characters, the bus driver Ralph Kramden, stands in front of the main entrance to the original South Wing. The plaque reads, "Jackie Gleason as Ralph Kramden - Bus Driver - Raccoon Lodge Treasurer - Dreamer - Presented by the People of TV Land".

Triple Bridge Gateway, completed in 2009, is an art installation by Leni Schwendinger Light Projects, underneath the ramps connecting the tunnel and the terminal; it is part of the transformation of the Ninth Avenue entrance of the South Wing.

In July 2011, PABT became home to the world's largest mediamesh, a stainless steel fabric embedded with light-emitting diodes (LEDs) for various types of media, art, and advertising imagery. The LED imagery façade covers 6,000 square feet, and wraps around the corner of 42nd Street and Eighth Avenue.

Configuration

Information and ticketing
For many years there was no timetable board displaying departures at PABT; passengers were required to inquire at information booths or ticket counters for schedules and departure gates. In 2015, both the Port Authority and NJ Transit installed screens listing upcoming scheduled departures, though buses are not tracked so delays are not communicated via this method.

Tickets can be purchased on the main level (ground floor) of the South Wing at the main ticket plaza; Greyhound, Trailways and Short Line have additional ticket counters in the terminal.

New Jersey Transit (NJT) maintains a customer service counter at the terminal on the south wing main level (open weekdays). NJT has ticket vending machines (TVM) throughout the terminal. Effective in 2009, passengers boarding NJT buses are required to purchase a ticket before boarding. In April 2012, NJT began re-equipping machines that would give change for those paying cash with bills rather than $1 coins. NJT also accepts contactless payment systems (such as Apple Pay and Google Pay) at TVMs, NJT's mobile app, and ticket windows.

Gates

There are 223 departure gates of either saw-tooth (pull-in) or island platform (pull-through) design at PABT. At the Subway Level, or lower level of both wings, Gates 1-85 are predominantly used for long-distance travel, including buses to Canada, and jitneys, and during overnight hours (1 a.m. to 6 a.m.) for commuter lines. From 6 a.m. to 1 a.m., during the hours of normal operation, Gates 200–425, numbered to indicate the different boarding areas (100, 200, 300, etc.) within the complex are accessible from the 2nd floor and serve short-haul commuter lines. Most NJ Transit routes and New Jersey private carrier commuter routes are on the 200, 300, and 400 levels.

Retail and entertainment
Like other transit hubs, PABT has undergone a series of renovations to create a mall-like sphere to promote its retail, food, entertainment, and services spaces. There are numerous franchise stores, such as Heartland Brewery, Au Bon Pain, Jamba Juice, Starbucks, Hudson News, Duane Reade, GNC, plus a United States Postal Service branch station, as well as a variety of restaurants and bars throughout the terminal. Frames, a bowling alley (previously long known as Leisure Time Bowling) occupies a large space on the 2nd floor.

Restrooms
Men's and women's restrooms in the bus terminal have been the subject of media attention; the women's restroom on the second floor is the terminal's busiest. It acts as a makeup counter, frequented by crowds daily due to its lighting, large mirrors, and cleanliness, a noted contrast to the rest of the unpopular terminal.

The men's restrooms are the subject of an ongoing lawsuit against the Port Authority's police department. The lawsuit exposed a trend of plainclothes officers targeting homosexual or effeminate men at the bus terminal's restrooms. Five officers, of about 1,700 in the department, were responsible for 70 percent of public lewdness arrests in 2014, the year the lawsuit was filed. Most of the arrests have been for masturbation; the lawsuit alleged most of the arrests are targeted at LGBT men who have not performed any wrongful acts. The Port Authority Police Department ended the practice in 2022.

Companies

The Port Authority Bus Terminal is served by the following lines:

Commuter lines
Academy Bus
Coach USA
Community Coach
Rockland Coaches
Short Line
Suburban Trails
Community Lines
DeCamp Bus Lines
Lakeland Bus Lines
Martz Trailways
New Jersey Transit (Routes 107-199)
OurBus
Spanish Transportation
Trans-Bridge Lines

Airport buses
Olympia Trails to Newark Airport

Intercity operators
Adirondack Trailways
C&J
Coach Company (OurBus)
Fullington Trailways
Greyhound Lines
Megabus
OurBus Prime
Peter Pan Bus Lines
Short Line

Sightseeing
Gray Line New York
The RIDE, nearby on the north side of 42nd Street and Eighth Avenue

Connecting transport

Several bus routes operated by New York City Bus, including the  local buses and the  Staten Island express buses, stop immediately outside the terminal.

In the last decade, numerous jitney routes serving Hudson and Passaic counties in northern New Jersey pick up passengers inside the bus terminal or on the street outside the terminal. Dollar vans operated by Spanish Transportation to Paterson and Community Lines jitneys to Journal Square use platforms on the lower level. Routes to Bergenline Avenue/GWB Plaza, and Boulevard East depart from 42nd Street outside the bus terminal's North Wing.

In 2011, a controversy arose when Megabus, a long-distance carrier using double-decker buses, with the permission of the New York City Department of Transportation, began to use the streets and sidewalk at the terminal. The director of the PANYNJ, citing safety, as well as other long-haul companies (which paid rent to use the terminal) citing unfair competitive advantage, were opposed to the permission to allow the company use of 41st Street directly beneath the connection between the two wings of the Port Authority. Despite these concerns and complaints, Megabus was initially permitted to stay. However, the permission was withdrawn later that year. Megabus now largely uses street-side stops near the Javits Center (for pickup) and Penn Station (for drop-off), except for a limited number of routes which use PABT.

Capacity and overflow

PABT is the gateway for most bus and jitney traffic entering Manhattan with more than 190,000 passengers on 6,000 bus trips made through the Lincoln Tunnel and terminal daily. The Lincoln Tunnel Approach and Helix (Route 495) in Hudson County, New Jersey passes through a cut and descends the Hudson Palisades to the Lincoln Tunnel; PABT is located at the other end. Starting in 1964, studies were conducted to address the feasibility of an exclusive bus lane (XBL) during the weekday morning peak period. The XBL, first implemented in 1970, serves weekday eastbound bus traffic between 6 a.m. and 10 a.m. The lane is fed by the New Jersey Turnpike at Exits 16E and 17 and New Jersey Route 3. The helix, tunnel, and terminal are owned and operated by the Port Authority of New York and New Jersey (PANYNJ), the bi-state agency that also implements the  contraflow express bus left lane in three westbound lanes. The XBL serves over 1,800 buses and 65,000 bus commuters on regular weekday mornings and is a major component of the morning "inbound" commutation crossing the Hudson River.  Over 100 bus carriers utilize the Exclusive Bus Lane. As of 2013, New Jersey Transit operates fifty-seven interstate bus routes through the Lincoln Tunnel, as do numerous regional and long-distance companies.

Despite the XBL to the tunnel, there are often long delays due to congestion caused by the limited capacity of bus lanes for deboarding passengers at the bus terminal, which has reached its capacity. leading to re-routing and overflow on local streets In December 2011, the New Jersey Assembly passed a resolution calling upon the PANYNJ to address the issue of congestion. Congestion contributed to a decline of the on-time performance of buses, which was 92 percent in 2012 and 85 percent in the first quarter of 2014. Thomas Duane, representing New York's 29th Senate District which includes the area around PABT, has also called for reduced congestion in the neighborhood. A consortium of regional transportation advocates, the Tri-State Transportation Campaign, have proposed a reconfiguration and expansion of the terminal, a PM westbound XBL, bus stops at other Manhattan locations, and a new bus storage depot. A proposed bus garage in Midtown, so that daytime turnover buses could avoid unnecessarily traveling through the tunnel without passengers, was scrapped by the agency in October 2011. In May 2012, the commissioner of NJDOT suggested that some NJ Transit routes could originate/terminate at other Manhattan locations, notably the East Side; an arrangement requiring approval of the NYC Department of Transportation (NYCDOT) to use bus stops.

Notes

References

External links

Port Authority Bus Terminal Website
Port Authority Bus Terminal History
PATH station details
New Jersey Transit station details
Competition for a Bus Terminal Replacement
Guide to the Port Authority Bus Terminal
Buses, The Lincoln Tunnel, and The Port Authority Bus Terminal

1950 establishments in New York City
42nd Street (Manhattan)
Bus stations in New York City
Eighth Avenue (Manhattan)
Hell's Kitchen, Manhattan
Lincoln Tunnel
NJ Transit Bus Operations
NJ Transit bus stations
Port Authority of New York and New Jersey
Transit hubs serving New Jersey
Transportation buildings and structures in Manhattan